Acalypta is a genus of lace bugs in the family Tingidae.
This genus is closely related to Dictyonota, Kalama and Derephysia: in the tribe Tingini.

Species

References

Further reading

 
 
 
 
 
 
 
 
 
 
 

Tingidae